Flaming Lotus Girls is a volunteer-based group of artists who make large-scale kinetic fire art. FLG has been described as a "women-focused anarchist art collective." The group began in 2000, in San Francisco, California, as a group of six women and two men who wanted to gain the fabrication skills and design experience needed to create large sculptural installations. The group includes over a hundred members of all genders, and a majority of the members are women. Many of the sculptures have interactive elements, allowing the audience to control the lighting, flames, sound, or other effects. The collective's work has appeared throughout the United States, as well as in Canada, Australia, and the Netherlands.

Art

Sea of Dreams (2022)
Sea of Dreams is a 2022 Black Rock City Honoraria project.

Serenity (2019)
Serenity is a 2019 Black Rock City Honoraria project. It features a group of three giant, and many smaller fireflies escaping the pieces of a large broken jar. Serenity is primarily sculpted in steel - and features interactive flame and LED effects at night. It debuted at Burning Man in August 2019.

Noetica (2017)
Noetica is a set of two sculptures constructed from 144 stainless steel squares carved with intricate patterns. The larger of the two sculptures is hydraulically powered - and may be controlled by manually manipulating the smaller sculpture. Noetica was displayed in Black Rock City, NV in 2017.

Pulse (2016) 
Pulse is an anatomically-correct heart that beats fire through its four chambers, emulating the blood flow through the human heart. The outer steel structure mimics the intricate vasculature and predominant veins and arteries. Above the heart chambers, the aortic arch shoots pulses of fire into the night sky. The sculpture was displayed at the SOMArts Cultural Center in San Francisco in 2016 as part of an event promoting a Flaming Lotus Girls photo calendar.

Xylophage (2013) 
Xylophage is a giant sculptural fungi featuring sound, light and fire, sprouting from the remains of an enormous tree. Xylophage appeared at Burning Man in 2013.

Tympani Lambada (2011)

Tympani Lambada is a sculptural representation of the inner ear, with interactive controls for its flames and LED lights. The sculpture is approximately 80 by 40 feet and weighs 20,000-25,000 pounds. The planning and construction of the sculpture involved building large trusses out of pipes that carry propane, linked with 140 joints.

Soma (2009)

Soma is a stainless steel neuron that illustrates flowing electricity through crowd-controlled LED light patterns that shoot along its dendrites and axon. Soma appeared at Electric Daisy Carnival in 2013. In 2014 it was installed at Pier 14 along the Embarcadero on the San Francisco waterfront for one year, adapted to light up with LED lights instead of the original balls of fire. In 2016 it moved to Vallejo, California as a public art installation for two years, as part of an effort to draw visitors to the city's downtown and waterfront areas.

Mutopia (2008)

Mutopia is a spiraling sculpture of "seedpods," laid out according to the Golden Ratio, a proportion found throughout art and nature. This sculpture was also displayed at Maker Faire Bay Area in 2011.

The Serpent Mother (2006)
The Serpent Mother is a  sculpture of a skeletal serpent coiled around her egg. Serpent Mother has appeared at Electric Daisy Carnival and Coachella in 2012 and Burning Man. In 2017, Serpent Mother was featured at Beakerhead in Calgary. In 2018, Serpent Mother was featured at the White Night Festival in Melbourne, Australia.

The Angel of the Apocalypse (2005)

This sculpture, originally built of steel, driftwood and fire systems, rises from the earth in the form of an abstracted bird. The Angel's wings burn continuously with ambient flame, and each feather features audience-controlled "poofer" fire effects.

Participants are invited to move around and between the Angel's feathers, and to climb and sit atop its driftwood torso.

During its debut appearance at Burning Man, the driftwood torso was burnt as part of the performance. A new steel one was designed and constructed in the winter of 2009–2010, to bring to Toronto's Winter Festival.

The Seven Sisters (2004)

The Seven Sisters include Alcyone, Celano, Maia, Taygeta, Asterope, Merope, and Electra.

A Merope rebuild was completed in March 2012, and features CNC plasma-cut stainless steel sides.

The Hand of God (2003)
A  copper sculpture of a woman's hand that shoots flame from all five fingers.

Mini Mega Jr. (2002)

Fire Fan (2002)
Huge plumes of liquid fire controlled by MIDI.

Fire Island (2002)
Interactive flaming flowers, cacti, arbors and more.

Flaming Flower Garden (2001)
A garden of fire, including copper flowers, a lily pond, and a weeping willow.

Flaming Lotus Sr. (2000)
A sculptural flame thrower. Created for the 2000 Burning Man Festival.

Film 
The Flaming Lotus Girls were featured in Dust & Illusions, a documentary about the history of Burning Man. Pouneh Mortazavi, Rebecca Anders, Rosa Anna DeFilippis, Caroline Miller, Charlie Gadeken and James Stauffer were the Flaming Lotus Girls members interviewed for the film. The footage features the Serpent Mother.

References

External links
Official Flaming Lotus Girls Web site
Flaming Lotus Girls blog

American artist groups and collectives
Burning Man
Culture of San Francisco
History of women in California